The International Agreement for the suppression of the White Slave Traffic (also known as the White Slave convention) is a series of anti–human trafficking treaties, specifically aimed at the illegal trade of white humans, the first of which was first negotiated in Paris in 1904. It was one of the first multilateral treaties to address issues of slavery and human trafficking. The convention held that human trafficking was a punishable crime and that the 12 signatories should exchange information regarding human trafficking operations.

The Slavery, Servitude, Forced Labour and Similar Institutions and Practices Convention of 1926 and the International Convention for the Suppression of the Traffic in Women and Children of 1933 are similar documents.

Early treaties
The initial treaty was concluded in Paris on 18 May 1904 and came into force on 18 July 1905. A total of 26 states ratified the original 1904 treaty. However, five years after the treaty came into force, it was re-negotiated in Paris and concluded on 4 May 1910. The 1910 treaty came into force on 5 July 1920, and a total of 41 states ratified it.

1949 Protocol
In 1949 in Lake Success, New York, a Protocol was negotiated which amended and updated both the 1904 and the 1910 treaties. The Protocol was concluded on 4 May 1949 and came into force on the same date. The resulting amended treaties came into force on 21 June 1951 (1904 version) and 14 August 1951 (1910 version). As of 2013, 33 states have ratified the amending Protocol and the amended 1949 versions of the treaties have 54 state parties.

See also
Child grooming

References

External links
Ratifications of initial 1904 treaty
Ratifications of initial 1910 treaty
Ratifications of 1949 amending Protocol
Ratifications of amended 1904 treaty
Ratifications of amended 1910 treaty

Anti-prostitution activism
Anti-slavery treaties
Treaties concluded in 1904
Treaties concluded in 1910
Treaties concluded in 1949
Treaties entered into force in 1905
Treaties entered into force in 1920
Treaties entered into force in 1951
1904 in France
1910 in France
1949 in New York (state)
Treaties of Belgium
Treaties of Denmark
Treaties of the French Third Republic
Treaties of the German Empire
Treaties of the Kingdom of Italy (1861–1946)
Treaties of the Netherlands
Treaties of the Kingdom of Portugal
Treaties of the Russian Empire
Treaties of Spain under the Restoration
Treaties of the United Kingdoms of Sweden and Norway
Treaties of Switzerland
Treaties of the United Kingdom (1801–1922)
Treaties of Austria-Hungary
Treaties of the First Brazilian Republic
Treaties of the Kingdom of Bulgaria
Treaties of Czechoslovakia
Treaties of Lebanon
Treaties of Luxembourg
Treaties of Congress Poland
Treaties of the United States
Treaties of the Bahamas
Treaties of the Czech Republic
Treaties of Fiji
Treaties of Slovakia
Treaties of Zimbabwe
Treaties of Sweden
Treaties of Chile
Treaties of the Republic of China (1912–1949)
Treaties of Colombia
Treaties of Cuba
Treaties of the Kingdom of Egypt
Treaties of Estonia
Treaties of Finland
Treaties of the Irish Free State
Treaties of the Empire of Japan
Treaties of Lithuania
Treaties of Monaco
Treaties of Norway
Treaties of the Qajar dynasty
Treaties of Thailand
Treaties of Turkey
Treaties of Uruguay
Treaties of Yugoslavia
Treaties of Algeria
Treaties of Australia
Treaties of Austria
Treaties of the Republic of Dahomey
Treaties of Cameroon
Treaties of Canada
Treaties of the Central African Republic
Treaties of the Republic of the Congo
Treaties of Ivory Coast
Treaties of Cyprus
Treaties of the French Fourth Republic
Treaties of West Germany
Treaties of East Germany
Treaties of Ghana
Treaties of the Dominion of India
Treaties of Pahlavi Iran
Treaties of Ireland
Treaties of Italy
Treaties of Jamaica
Treaties of Madagascar
Treaties of Malawi
Treaties of Mali
Treaties of Malta
Treaties of Mauritius
Treaties of Mexico
Treaties of Montenegro
Treaties of Morocco
Treaties of Niger
Treaties of Nigeria
Treaties of the Dominion of Pakistan
Treaties of Senegal
Treaties of Serbia and Montenegro
Treaties of Singapore
Treaties of the Union of South Africa
Treaties of the Dominion of Ceylon
Treaties of Trinidad and Tobago
Treaties of Tanganyika
Treaties of Zambia
Treaties of the Kingdom of Iraq
Treaties of Sierra Leone
Slave trade
Human trafficking treaties
Treaties extended to Ashmore and Cartier Islands
Treaties extended to the Australian Antarctic Territory
Treaties extended to Christmas Island
Treaties extended to the Cocos (Keeling) Islands
Treaties extended to Heard Island and McDonald Islands
Treaties extended to Norfolk Island
Treaties extended to the Coral Sea Islands
Treaties extended to French Algeria
Treaties extended to Clipperton Island
Treaties extended to French Comoros
Treaties extended to the French Southern and Antarctic Lands
Treaties extended to French Somaliland
Treaties extended to French Guiana
Treaties extended to French Polynesia
Treaties extended to Guadeloupe
Treaties extended to Martinique
Treaties extended to Mayotte
Treaties extended to New Caledonia
Treaties extended to Réunion
Treaties extended to Saint Pierre and Miquelon
Treaties extended to Wallis and Futuna
Treaties extended to French West Africa
Treaties extended to French Equatorial Africa
Treaties extended to French Cameroon
Treaties extended to French India
Treaties extended to the French Protectorate of Tunisia
Treaties extended to French Morocco
Treaties extended to French Togoland
Treaties extended to French Madagascar
Treaties extended to the New Hebrides
Treaties extended to Greenland
Treaties extended to the Faroe Islands
Treaties extended to the Colony of the Bahamas
Treaties extended to the Colony of Barbados
Treaties extended to British Guiana
Treaties extended to the British Solomon Islands
Treaties extended to the Colony of Fiji
Treaties extended to the Gambia Colony and Protectorate
Treaties extended to Gibraltar
Treaties extended to the Gilbert and Ellice Islands
Treaties extended to the Gold Coast (British colony)
Treaties extended to the Colony of Jamaica
Treaties extended to the British Leeward Islands
Treaties extended to the British Windward Islands
Treaties extended to British Dominica
Treaties extended to the Crown Colony of Malta
Treaties extended to the Northern Nigeria Protectorate
Treaties extended to the Emirate of Transjordan
Treaties extended to Mandatory Palestine
Treaties extended to Saint Helena, Ascension and Tristan da Cunha
Treaties extended to the Colony of Sarawak
Treaties extended to the Crown Colony of Seychelles
Treaties extended to the Colony of Sierra Leone
Treaties extended to British Somaliland
Treaties extended to Southern Rhodesia
Treaties extended to British Ceylon
Treaties extended to the Crown Colony of Trinidad and Tobago
Treaties extended to the Uganda Protectorate
Treaties extended to the Sultanate of Zanzibar
Treaties extended to Weihaiwei
Treaties extended to Curaçao and Dependencies
Treaties extended to the Dutch East Indies
Treaties extended to Surinam (Dutch colony)
Treaties of the Colony of New Zealand
Treaties extended to the Danish West Indies
Treaties extended to Iceland (dependent territory)
Treaties extended to German East Africa
Treaties extended to German Samoa
Treaties extended to German New Guinea
Treaties extended to German South West Africa
Treaties extended to German West Africa
Treaties extended to the Dominion of Newfoundland
Treaties extended to the Straits Settlements
Treaties extended to the Territory of Papua
Treaties extended to Mandatory Iraq
Treaties extended to Australia
Treaties extended to Canada
Treaties extended to New Zealand
Treaties extended to British Hong Kong
Treaties extended to Anglo-Egyptian Sudan
Treaties extended to West Berlin
Treaties extended to British Cameroon
Treaties extended to British Togoland